Garden Party is a 2017 French 3D computer-animated short film directed by Illogic Collective, six French 3D artists during their studies at MoPA, animation school in France. This short film is their graduation film. The short has been presented and won awards in a number of festivals including the Clermont-Ferrand Film Festival, the SIGGRAPH, and the Nashville Film Festival where it won the Oscar Qualifying prize of Grand Jury Prize for best animation.

The short was nominated for the Academy Award for Best Animated Short Film at the 90th Academy Awards.

Plot
In a deserted rich house, a couple of amphibians explore their surroundings. An emerald green frog swims through a murky swimming pool while being followed by a bigger toad. They eventually end up in a bed room that has all its sheets scattered about. A small yellow frog tries and fails to catch a butterfly to eat and a larger fatter toad awakens in a kitchen full of rancid food. This does not stop it from dining on caviar and macarons. The yellow frog makes its way into the house through one of the numerous bullet holes in the glass windows. An open safe and a gun can be seen, implying that a violent gun fight occurred there. As the night falls, the yellow frog finds the house's security room and begins accidentally turning on numerous switches; lighting up a painting that reveals the house's owner. Lights, music and water effects turn on outside as more amphibians show up to enjoy their new paradise. As they do so, the body of the house's owner, clad solely in a bathrobe, floats to the top of the pool, having been pickled and swollen from resting at the bottom for so long. The amphibians pay no mind to him.

Reception

Critical response
Garden Party has an approval rating of 100% on review aggregator website Rotten Tomatoes, based on 11 reviews, and an average rating of 9.00/10.

Awards
Since its launch, the film has received numerous awards, and selected in more than 180 festivals around the world.

The short was part of the world touring screening The Animation Showcase 2017.

References

External links
 
 
 
 

2017 films
2017 3D films
2017 short films
2017 comedy films
2017 computer-animated films
2010s French animated films
2010s fantasy comedy films
2010s animated short films
French 3D films
French computer-animated films
French animated fantasy films
French fantasy comedy films
French animated short films
3D animated short films
Animated films about frogs
Animated films about amphibians
Works about suburbs
Animated films set in France
Films set in 2016
Summer in culture
Animated films without speech